The Tenor – Lirico Spinto is a 2014 biopic chronicling the life of South Korean tenor Bae Jae-chul who performed in numerous European operas, but lost his voice at the peak of his career due to thyroid cancer. However, after enduring a long period of painful rehabilitation, with the help of his wife Yoon-hee as well as his longtime friend and Japanese producer Koji Sawada, Bae regained his singing ability and half his vocal range. Bae was portrayed by Yoo Ji-tae.

The film premiered at the 17th Shanghai International Film Festival, and was released in South Korea on December 31, 2014.

Cast
Yoo Ji-tae as Bae Jae-chul
Yusuke Iseya as Koji Sawada
Cha Ye-ryun as Yoon-hee
Nataša Tapušković
Marko Stojanović

Production
The film's early working title was Miracle, but director Kim Sang-man changed it because he thought it disclosed the ending, while he hoped the unfamiliar term lirico spinto would arouse Korean viewers' curiosity. Lirico spinto, Italian for "pushed lyric", refers to a tenor voice that is versatile enough to sing in the style of a lirico, a singer with a softer voice and a spinto, one with dramatic voice; Bae could do both. For his role, actor Yoo Ji-tae practiced singing every day for more than a year and underwent further vocal training to acquire the technique to believably lip sync every opera song he sings in the film; he also took English lessons.

Due to budget constraints, it took six years for the film to be completed. The production crew filmed in Korea, Japan and Serbia for 18 months.

Awards and nominations

References

External links

2014 films
Japanese biographical films
South Korean biographical films
Documentary films about singers
Biographical films about singers
2010s Japanese films
2010s South Korean films